Guerrilla theatre, generally rendered "guerrilla theater" in the US, is a form of guerrilla communication originated in 1965 by the San Francisco Mime Troupe, who, in spirit of the Che Guevara writings from which the term guerrilla is taken, engaged in performances in public places committed to "revolutionary sociopolitical change." The group performances, aimed against the Vietnam war and capitalism, sometimes contained nudity, profanity and taboo subjects that were shocking to some members of the audiences of the time.

Guerrilla (Spanish for "little war"), as applied to theatrical events, describes the act of spontaneous, surprise performances in unlikely public spaces to an unsuspecting audience. Typically these performances intend to draw attention to a political/social issue through satire, protest, and carnivalesque techniques. Many of these performances were a direct result of the radical social movements of the late 1960s through mid-1970s. Guerrilla Theater, also referred to as guerrilla performance, has been sometimes related to the agitprop theater of the 1930s, but it is differentiated from agitprop by the inclusion of Dada performance tactics.

Origins
The term Guerrilla Theater was coined by Peter Berg, who in 1965 suggested it to R.G. Davis as the title of his essay on the actions of the  San Francisco Mime Troupe, an essay that was first published in 1966. The term "guerrilla" was inspired by a passage in a 1961 Che Guevara essay, which read:

Davis had studied mime and modern dance in the 1950s and had discovered commedia dell'arte. In autumn 1966 around 20 members of the San Francisco Mime Troupe broke off and started their own collective called the Diggers, who took their name from a group of 17th century radicals in England.

Guerrilla theater in practice 

Guerrilla theater shares its origins with many forms of political protest and street theatre including agitprop (agitation-propaganda), carnival, parades, pageants, political protest, performance art, happenings, and, most notably, the Dada movement and guerrilla art.  Although this movement is widely studied in Theater History classrooms, the amount of research and documentation of guerrilla theater is surprisingly lacking.  The term, "Guerrilla Theater" seems to have emerged during the mid-1960s primarily as an upshot of activist Radical Theater groups such as The Living Theatre, San Francisco Mime Troupe, Bread and Puppet Theater, El Teatro Campesino, and the Free Southern Theater. It also has important roots in Allan Kaprow's "happenings".

The first widely documented guerrilla performances were carried out under the leadership of Abbie Hoffman and the Youth International Party (Yippies).  One of their most publicized events occurred on August 24, 1967, at the New York Stock Exchange where Hoffman and other Yippies threw dollar bills onto the trading floor below.  Creating a media frenzy, the event was publicized internationally.  In his later publication, Soon to be a Major Motion Picture (1980), Hoffman refers to his television appearances with specially planned subversive tactics as "guerrilla theater."

Guerrilla theater was used as a protest demonstration by the anti-war organization Vietnam Veterans Against the War. An article from the summer of 1971 published in the glossy magazine Ramparts detailed one such performance in Washington, D.C.:

Post-1970s performance theater

Another guerrilla performance group that continued the use of the term was the Guerrilla Girls.  This group of feminist artist-activists was established in New York City in 1985 with the purpose of bringing attention to the lack of female artists in major art galleries and museums.  The Guerrilla Girls began their work through guerrilla art tactics which broadened to include guerrilla theater.  Some common practices in their guerrilla theater techniques that have been replicated by other groups include appearing in costume, using assumed names, and disguising their identity.

Guerrilla theater groups

The origins and legacy of guerrilla theater can be seen in the work of these political/performance groups:

 ACT UP
 Billionaires for Bush
 Billionaires for Wealthcare
 Bread and Puppet Theater
 The Church of Euthanasia
 Circus Amok
 Clandestine Insurgent Rebel Clown Army
 El Teatro Campesino
 Free Southern Theater
 Reclaim the Streets
 Reverend Billy and the Church of Stop Shopping
 San Francisco Mime Troupe
 Situationism
 Vietnam Veterans Against the War
 Youth International Party (Yippies)
 FEMEN

Footnotes

Further reading
 Durland, Steven.  "Witness: The Guerrilla Theater of Greenpeace."  Radical Street Performance.  Jan Cohen-Cruz, ed.  New York: Routledge, 1998, pp. 67–73.
 Hoffman, Abbie.  "America Has More Television Sets Than Toilets."  Radical Street Performance.  Jan Cohen-Cruz, ed.  New York: Routledge, 1998, pp. 190–195.

External links

 Eden Silva Jequinto, "Guerrilla Theater Documentary," Eastside Arts Alliances, Feb. 24, 2013. —Video.

Activism by type
Culture jamming techniques
Political communication
Theatrical genres
Street theatre